The following elections occurred in the year 1836.

Europe

Spain
 February 1836 Spanish general election
 July 1836 Spanish general election
 October 1836 Spanish general election

North America

Canada
 1836 Newfoundland general election

United States
 1836 New York gubernatorial election
 1836 and 1837 United States House of Representatives elections
 1836 and 1837 United States Senate elections
 1836 United States presidential election

South America
 1836 Chilean presidential election

See also
 :Category:1836 elections

1836
Elections